The 2022–23 Andebol 1 (known as the Campeonato Placard Andebol 1) is the 71st season of the Andebol 1, Portuguese premier handball league. It runs from 17 September 2022 to 23 June 2023.

Teams

Arenas and locations

The following 14 clubs compete in the Andebol 1 during the 2022–23 season:

League table

Matches

Round 1

Round 2

Round 3

Round 4

Round 5

Round 6

Round 7

Round 8

Top goalscorers

See also
 2022-23 Portuguese Handball Cup
  2022 Portuguese Handball Super Cup

References

External links
Portuguese Handball Federaration 

Andebol 1
Portugal
Handball
Portugal